Dumka Airport (IATA: none, ICAO: IN-0100), also known as Sido Kanhu Airport, is a private airport and a military base that is located in Dumka, 
Jharkhand, India. The airport currently does not have any scheduled commercial services and is used only by gliders, private companies and  government aircraft. Scheduled services were to begin to the state capital Ranchi under the government's UDAN scheme. The airport's expansion is underway for the commencement of scheduled passenger services.
There are also plans to use the facility for training pilots.

See also 
 Deoghar Airport
 Birsa Munda Airport

References

Defunct airports in India
Airports in Jharkhand
Airports with year of establishment missing
Dumka district